The Göppingen Gö 3 Minimoa is a single-seat sailplane produced in Germany. It was designed by Martin Schempp and Wolf Hirth and was produced the year after their first glider, the Göppingen Gö 1. It first flew in 1935. The name is derived from the name Moazagotl given to lenticularis clouds caused by the foehn wind in Sudetenland. The name was used for one of Hirth's earlier gliders and since the Gö 3 was a smaller version, it was called 'Mini' as a diminutive.

It established several records, including the world altitude record of 6,687 m (21,939 ft) in 1938 in a thunderstorm. Richard du Pont and Chet Decker flew Minimoas to win the US Championships in 1937 and 1938.

It was made out of wood and fabric with cantilevered 'gull' wings. A B-version in 1938 had thinner wings with a modified section and the gull's kink in a different place. The undercarriage was non-retractable. It was the first glider built to carry water-ballast in a tank behind the pilot.

Only five Minimoas remain airworthy: two in Germany, one in Japan, one replica built in the Netherlands and the latest one to fly in the U.K. One more is being prepared for flight in Bacchus Marsh Australia.

A 1935 Minimoa is on display at the National Soaring Museum in Elmira, NY (USA).  The only known Minimoa still in private ownership in the USA is a 1938 owned by Jerry Wenger in Powell, WY (USA).

Specifications (Gö 3)

See also

External links

 Sailplane directory
  - Minimoa CC-PIA preserved at Museo Nacional Aeronáutico y del Espacio de Chile
 National Soaring Museum - Goppingen 3 Minimoa on display at the National Soaring Museum in Elmira, NY, U.S.A.
 Minimoa  - History and photos of the Minimoa at Scalesoaring.co.uk

1930s German sailplanes
Schempp-Hirth aircraft
Gull-wing aircraft
Aircraft first flown in 1935